John William Menzies (April 12, 1819 – October 3, 1897) was a nineteenth-century politician, lawyer and judge from Kentucky.

Born in Bryan Station, Kentucky, Menzies attended the common schools as a child and later graduated from the University of Virginia in 1840. He studied law and was admitted to the bar, commencing practice in Covington, Kentucky in 1841. He was a member of the Kentucky House of Representatives in 1848 and 1855 before being elected a Unionist to the United States House of Representatives in 1860, serving from 1861 to 1863. Afterwards, he resumed practicing law in Covington, Kentucky and was a delegate to the Democratic National Convention in 1864. Menzies served as a judge of the chancery court from 1873 to 1893 and afterwards resumed practicing law until his death in Falmouth, Kentucky on October 3, 1897. He was buried in Linden Grove Cemetery in Covington, Kentucky.

External links

1819 births
1897 deaths
Politicians from Lexington, Kentucky
Unionist Party members of the United States House of Representatives from Kentucky
Democratic Party members of the Kentucky House of Representatives
Kentucky state court judges
Kentucky lawyers
Politicians from Covington, Kentucky
People from Pendleton County, Kentucky
University of Virginia alumni
19th-century American politicians
19th-century American judges
19th-century American lawyers
Democratic Party members of the United States House of Representatives from Kentucky